California's 8th congressional district is a congressional district in the U.S. state of California. As of 2023, Democrat John Garamendi represents the district. Currently, the 8th district includes parts of the Bay Area counties of Contra Costa County and Solano County, including the cities of Vallejo, Fairfield, Richmond and parts of Martinez.

Competitiveness
Before the 2011 redistricting, the 8th district was a Democratic stronghold.  It gave John Kerry his best performance in California in 2004, backing the Democrat with 84.2% of the vote. Barack Obama continued on this trend in 2008 when he received 85.22% of the vote in the district while John McCain received 12.38%.

The 8th district from 2013-2023 was located in a politically conservative region of the state with a "Strongly Republican" Cook Partisan Voting Index of R+10.  The Cook Political Report ranked it the 87th most Republican-leaning congressional district in the United States.

In the 2012 election, the first after the state's adoption of top-two primaries, the 8th district was one of only two in California where two Republicans faced each other in a runoff election. In 2018, it was the only such California district.

Election results from statewide races

Composition

As of 2023, California's 8th congressional district was significantly changed, now being located between the Sacramento and San Joaquin Valleys. It encompasses part of Contra Costa and Solano Counties.

Contra Costa County is split between this district and the 10th district. They are partitioned by Grizzly Peak Blvd, Seaview Trail, Camino Pablo, Bear Creek Rd, San Pablo Creek, Bear Creek, Brianes Reservoir, Burlington Northern Santa Fe, Highway 4, Alhambra Ave, Pacheco Blvd, Grandview Ave, Central Ave, Imhoff Dr, Bares Ave, Mount Diablo Creek, Union Pacific, Contra Costa Canal, 4WD Rd, Bailey Rd, James Donlon Blvd, Cambridge Dr, Reseda Way, S Royal links Cir, Carpinteria Dr, Barmouth Dr, Hillcrest Ave, Highway 4, and Highway 160. The 8th district takes in the north side of the cities of Antioch and Martinez, the cities of Pittsburg, Richmond, San Pablo, El Cerrito, Pinole, and Hercules.

Solano County is split between this district and the 4th district. They are partitioned by Soda Springs Rd, Union Pacific, Alamo Dr, Leisure Town Rd, Hawkins Rd, Bay Area Exxextric, Shilo Rd, Collinsville Rd, and Montezuma Slough. The 8th district takes in the cities of Vallejo, Fairfield, Suisun City, and Benicia.

Cities & CDP with 10,000 or more people
 Vallejo - 126,090
 Fairfield - 119,881 
 Antioch - 115,291
 Richmond - 110,567
 Pittsburg - 76,416
 Martinez - 38,290
 San Pablo - 30,990
 Suisun City - 29,518
 Benicia - 27,131
 Hercules - 26,276
 El Cerrito - 25,962
 Pinole - 19,250

List of members representing the district

Election results

1902

1904

1906

1908

1910

1912

1914

1916

1918

1920

1922

1924

1926

1928

1930

1932

1934

1936

1938

1940

1942

1944

1946

1948

1950

1952

1954

1956

1958

1960

1962

1964

1966

1968

1970

1972

1974

1976

1978

1980

1982

1984

1986

1988

1990

1992

1994

1996

1998

2000

2002

2004

2006

2008

2010

2012

2014

2016

2018

2020

See also
List of United States congressional districts

References

External links
GovTrack.us: California's 8th congressional district
RAND California Election Returns: District Definitions  (out of date)
California Voter Foundation map — CD08 (out of date)
Ballotpedia: California's 8th congressional district

08
Government of Inyo County, California
Government of Mono County, California
Government of San Bernardino County, California
Mojave Desert
Owens Valley
San Bernardino Mountains
Searles Valley
Sierra Nevada (United States)
Victor Valley
Barstow, California
Bishop, California
Hesperia, California
Needles, California
Ridgecrest, California
Twentynine Palms, California
Victorville, California
Wrightwood, California
Yucca Valley, California
Constituencies established in 1903
1903 establishments in California